The South Korea men's national basketball team represents South Korea in international men's basketball competitions. It is administered by the Korea Basketball Association.

Based on the number of overall medals won, South Korea is a major force among basketball teams of FIBA Asia. The team has won a record number of 24 medals at the FIBA Asia Championship. Furthermore, South Korea is the only nation that has qualified for this event every year since it was first held in 1960.

History

Initiation (1947–1951)
In 1947, two years after the establishment of the People's Republic of Korea, the Korea Basketball Association joined the International Federation of Basketball (FIBA) and sent its national teams to FIBA-sponsored events. Only one year later, the team already celebrated its first major accomplishment at the 1948 Summer Olympics, when it finished 8th, better than any other Asian nation, and ahead of teams such as Canada, Argentina, and Italy.

Steady improvements (1952–1968)
At the 1954 Asian Games, for the first time ever, South Korea finished in the Final Four of a major international basketball tournament in Asia. The team slowly improved its position within Asia almost every year and qualified for the Basketball World Cup several times.

Golden years (1969–1970)
In 1969 and 1970, the team enjoyed a brief period to shine, when it won the 1969 Asian Championship and the 1970 Asian Games and ultimately qualified for the 1970 FIBA World Championship. As the only Asian team that had remained in the championship, South Korea finished ahead of Australia (champion of FIBA Oceania) and Egypt (champion of FIBA Africa) and showed its best performance ever at this event. Korea's Shin Dong-Pa dominated all scorers at the 1970 FIBA World Cup as he averaged 32.6 points per game, almost 13 points more than the runner up, Davis Peralta, from Panama.

Asian elite position behind China (1971–2007)
At the Asian Championship, South Korea stayed among the top three teams at 21 straight events, a record that is still unmatched until today. 

At the 1996 Olympics, Hyun Joo-Yup averaged 16.6 points through the entire tournament. 

At the 2005 FIBA Asia Championship, South Korea's medal-winning streak finally ended when they lost to Qatar at the 3rd place game . Between 1975 and 2005, South Korea was the only nation besides the Philippines that was able to seriously challenge China's dominance. It interrupted China's championship winning streak in 1997, when it defeated its dominant neighbor in the semifinals and ultimately won the crown as 1997 Champion of Asia.

At the 2007 FIBA Asia Championship, South Korea was able to go on a streak, and won the first 5 games. Because of the "four centers" Ha Seung-jin (221 cm), Kim Joo-sung (205 cm), Lee Dong-jun (202 cm), and Kim Min-soo (200 cm), South Korea had the tournament's highest 2-point field goal percentage (61%). South Korea was also a team that had a strong back court with Kim Seung-hyun (179 cm), Yang Dong-geun (182 cm), Kim Dong-woo (198 cm), and Choi Jin-soo (205 cm), who guaranteed that the team was in the tournaments top-3 in free throw percentage (70.6) and assists per game (11.5). All these players helped their team to win the bronze medal once again.

Emergence of West Asian competition (2008–2018)
In the modern era, South Korea's competition from West Asia intensified as countries such as Jordan, Qatar, Lebanon, and especially Iran improved their basketball programs. South Korea is still considered one of Asia's major teams but its position among the top three teams in Asia is not guaranteed anymore. In 2014, the team qualified for the Basketball World Cup for the first time in almost 20 years. Even though the team was eliminated in the first round, the qualification itself has been a success and provided much needed global exposure. Most of the players that played at the 2014 World Cup returned for the 2014 Asian Games where they helped secure the gold medal on home soil.

Former Jeonju KCC Egis manager Hur Jae took over as the national team coach in 2016. They reached the play-offs of the 2017 FIBA Asia Cup and won the bronze medal. At the 2018 Asian Games, South Korea was unable to defend their tournament gold medal due to the loss of key players to injuries. The public outcry, coupled by accusations that Hur had showed favoritism by selecting both his sons into the national team, prompted Hur to resign in September. Hur's former assistant Kim Sang-shik took over as the new coach.

2019 FIBA World Cup and generational change (2019–present)
Under Kim Sang-shik, the South Korean team secured their place at the 2019 FIBA Basketball World Cup. Kim also began introducing younger players into the squad on a more regular basis. However, Kim decided on a more experienced squad, with half the players selected aged 30 and above and Heo Hoon being the youngest player at 24. South Korea struggled with injury problems to key players during the tournament but ended their losing streak at the World Cup. They recorded their first win at the World Cup in 25 years by winning their last game of the tournament, a 80-71 win over the Ivory Coast. 

More signs of a "generational change" were visible as Kim called-up a squad composed only of players born in the 1990's for a 2022 FIBA Asia Cup qualifier against Indonesia. However, the COVID-19 pandemic disrupted much of 2020 as the closing of international borders and government-mandated quarantine regulations discouraged KBL teams from releasing valuable players to the national team, prompting a conflict between the Korean Basketball League (KBL) and the Korean Basketball Association (KBA). Kim resigned in late January 2021, citing his frustration over being caught in between the KBL and KBA and the failure of all parties to come to a resolution. Cho Sang-hyun took over in September 2021 and is expected to remain in charge until the 2023 FIBA Basketball World Cup.

In preparation of South Korea's participation in the 2023 FIBA Basketball World Cup Asian qualifiers, a two-week break from the regular season was scheduled in February 2022 for the national team call-ups. The Korean Basketball League was hit by the coronavirus as early as December 2021, with Changwon LG Sakers reporting their first case within the team. At the end of January 2022, KBL even made their first-ever match postponement due to the coronavirus, as multiple positive cases were reported in Seoul Samsung Thunders. Although stringent testing requirements and quarantine rules were implemented by KBL, it failed to lower the number of infections in the league. In February 2022, a massive outbreak occurred as many teams reported positive cases among their players and staff within a span of two weeks. Some teams could not field their main players as they were infected. Even so, KBL carried on with the scheduled matches as long as the participating teams could fill up the roster. Some players eventually took to social media to express their frustration publicly over the forced commencement of the league and lack of concern towards the wellbeing of the players. On the next day, KBL announced a suspension of the season for two weeks by postponing all remaining matches scheduled in February to a later date. The national basketball team took a major hit as most of the players on the preliminary roster submitted to FIBA at an earlier date, were infected by the coronavirus. Despite Cho's efforts of putting together a new roster, a player from the renewed roster was tested positive right before they depart to the Philippines on February 22. As a result, South Korea pulled out of the 2023 FIBA Basketball World Cup Asian qualifiers and was eventually disqualified. South Korea did try to appeal that decision, but it was rejected by FIBA. Hence, South Korea's appearance in the 2023 FIBA World Cup and the 2024 Summer Olympics is unclear as of now.

On April 29, 2022, Cho was announced as the new head coach of Changwon LG Sakers, and terminated his contract as the national team's head coach. After an open recruitment of a new head coach by the Korean Basketball Association, Choo Il-seung, previously a head coach for Goyang Orion Orions was chosen to lead the men's national basketball team effective May 19, 2022.

Competitions

Olympic Games

FIBA World Cup

<div style="text-align:left">

Asian Games

FIBA Asia Cup

East Asian Games

East Asia Basketball Championship

FIBA Asia Challenge

William Jones Cup

Team

Current roster
Tournament: 2022 FIBA Asia Cup (July 12, 2022 – July 24, 2022)

Past rosters

1970 World Championship: finished 11th among 13 teams

Shin Dong-pa, Lee In-pyo, Kim In-kun, Kim Young-il, Park Han, Choi Jong-kyu, Yoo Hee-hyung, Lee Byung-koo, Yoo Jung-kun, Lee Ja-young, Shin Hyun-soo, Kwak Hyun-chae (Coach: Kim Young-ki)

1978 World Championship: finished 13th among 14 teams

Kim In-Jin, Kim Pyung-Man, Jung Young-Soo, Jang Bong-Hak, Park Sang-Ung, Park Soo-Kyo, Kim Sang-Chun, Kim Hyung-Nyun, Kim Dong-Kwang, Koo Jong-Hoo, Lee Mun-Kyu, Choi Bu-Young (Coach: Kim Moo-Hyung)

1986 World Championship: finished 22nd among 24 teams

Hur Jae, Park In-kyu, Lee Min-hyun, Cho Yoon-ho, Han Ki-bum, Lee Mun-kyu, Kim Hyun-jun, Kim You-taek, Kim Sung-wook, Lee Won-woo, Lee Chung-hee, Goh Myong-hwa (Coach: Kim In-kun)

Head coaches 
  Jung Sang-yun (1948)
  Kim Young-ki (1970)
  Bang Yeol (1982–1983)
  Choi Bu-young (2006–2007)
  Hur Jae (2008–2009)
  Yoo Jae-hak (2010–2014)
  Kim Dong-gwang (2015)
  Hur Jae (2016–2018)
  Kim Sang-sik (2018–2021)
  Cho Sang-hyun (2021–2022)
  Choo Il-seung (2022–present)

Kit

Manufacturer
2002-present: Nike

Sponsor
 2016-2017: Hana Financial Group
 2018-present: KB Kookmin Bank

See also
South Korea women's national basketball team
South Korea national under-19 basketball team
South Korea national under-17 basketball team
South Korea national 3x3 team

References

External links

Official website
FIBA profile
 Asia-Basket.com
South Korea Basketball Records at FIBA Archive

Videos
Korea v Iraq - Semi-Final Highlights - FIBA Asia Challenge 2016  YouTube.com video

1947 establishments in South Korea
Basketball in South Korea
Men's national basketball teams
South Korea national basketball team